Anton Ausserdorfer (11 March 1836, in Anras – 16 September 1885, in Hall, Tirol) was an Austrian clergyman and botanical collector.

He served as a curate in Windisch-Matrei, and was a good friend of fellow clergyman/botanist Rupert Huter (1834–1919). He collected mainly in South Tyrol.

Plants with the specific epithet of ausserdorferi are named in his honor, an example being the grass species Avenastrum ausserdorferi.

Associated works 
 Katalog zum Herbar des Abiturienten Anton Außerdorfer : Alphabetisch geordnet und mit Einleitung über das Studium der Pflanzenkunde in Tirol bis zum Jahre 1855 versehen; Vinzenz Gasser, in: "Studien und Mitteilungen zur Geschichte des Benediktinerordens und seiner Zweige".

References 

1836 births
1885 deaths
People from Lienz District
Austrian clergy
19th-century Austrian botanists